Larei Lathup  is a 2021 Indian Meitei language film written and directed by Ojitbabu Ningthoujam. It stars Shilheiba Ningthoujam and Ithoi Oinam in the lead roles. The film was premiered at Manipur State Film Development Society (MSFDS) on 13 November 2021. It was the opening film (fiction) at the Festival of Cinemas of Manipur 2022, a 15-day long multi-lingual film festival organised by MSFDS in April 2022.

Cast
 Shilheiba Ningthoujam as Khoiraba
 Ithoi Oinam as Leirang
 Idhou as Elangbam Pheijao
 Lilabati Chanam as Shija
 Laishram Prakash as Shija's husband
 Prem Sharma
 Lamnganbi Laishram

Soundtrack
AK Yangoi composed the soundtrack for the film and Ojitbabu Ningthoujam wrote the lyrics. The song is titled Urure Phajaba Maithong.

Accolades
The film won 11 awards out of the 14 nominations at the 10th MANIFA 2022.

References

Meitei-language films
2021 films
2021 drama films
Indian drama films
2020s Indian films